The Sri Raja-Lakshmi Foundation is an Indian charitable trust that promotes arts, sciences, literature, medicine, journalism, humanities and other intellectual pursuits and to honour distinguished persons in these fields. Established in 1979 in Chennai by Late P.V. Ramaniah Raja, a businessman, the Foundation instituted the Raja-Lakshmi Award.

Erstwhile the Raja–Lakshmi Award carried a prize amount of ₹100,000/-, a Citation and a Plaque. The Awardees also received the Dr. K.V. Rao and Dr. Jyoti Rao Award of US$2000, in association with the Telugu Fine Arts Society (TFAS), New Jersey, USA.

The Foundation has also instituted the Ratna Rao Memorial Prize which is awarded annually to the best student in M.Sc. Chemistry at the Indian Institute of Technology Madras.

History 

The organisation, along with the Raja–Lakshmi Award, instituted awards such as the Raja–Lakshmi Literary Award (1987–1999) and "Recognise the Teacher" Award. Special awards (Raja–Lakshmi Visishta Puraskar) have also been announced on a one-off basis. Lakshmi-Raja Vaidika Puraskar was instituted in 1994, coinciding with the 60th birthday of Smt. Mahalakshmi Raja, founder trustee of the Foundation. This Award honours Vedic scholars, and consists of a Citation, a plaque and a cash prize of ₹25,000/-.

These Awards were announced on August 15 (birthday of Late Smt. Mahalakshmi Raja) every year and presented at a function on November 19 (birthday of Sri Ramaniah Raja) in the same year.

Activities 

The Foundation is now actively involved in charitable work in areas of Education, Education improvement, Environment, Health, Culture and assistance for special children.

Recipients

Raja-Lakshmi Award

Raja-Lakshmi Literary Award

Lakshmi-Raja Vaidika Puraskar

Raja-Lakshmi Recognise the Teacher Award

Raja-Lakshmi Visishta Puraskar

Ratna Rao Memorial Prize

Memorial lectures delivered

Publications

External links

Newspaper Articles 
 Build wealth without destroying environment'', The Hindu, Friday, Nov 20, 2009
 Raja-Lakshmi award for Sunita Narain'', The Hindu, Saturday, Aug 15, 2009
 Stress on regular eye check-up, The Hindu, Thursday, March 12, 2009 
 Raja-Lakshmi Foundation awards presented, The Hindu, Thursday, November 20, 2008
 "Raja-Lakshmi Award", Young World, The Hindu, Tuesday, August 19, 2008
 Sharath, Humpy to receive award, The Hindu, Friday, August 15, 2008
 Chess prodigy, table tennis player to get Raja-Lakshmi award , The Hindu, Thursday, August 14, 2008
 Raja-Lakshmi Award presented, The Hindu, Tuesday, November 20, 2007

  Lending it the S.P Touch, The Hindu, Nov 21, 2006
 Raja-Lakshmi award for S.P. Balasubrahmanyam, The Hindu, August 15, 2006
 Malladi Chandrasekhara Sastry selected for Raja-Lakshmi award, The Hindu, August 15, 2005
 
 

Indian awards
Awards established in 1979